Pygora cruralis is a species of Scarabaeidae, the dung beetle family.
It is native to Madagascar. Also, it was discovered by Fairmaire.

Etymology 
Pygora Cruralis meant Leg-tailed Flower in Greek.

Subspecies 
P. crualis meridionalis (Ruter, 1964)

References 

Cetoniinae
Beetles described in 1903